This list of governors of the state of Mato Grosso do Sul includes all the people who have held office in the history of Mato Grosso do Sul or who, having been elected, did not hold office due to death or impediment, since its official installation, on 1 January 1979

The current governor of Mato Grosso do Sul is Eduardo Riedel, elected on October 30, 2022 and sworn into office on January 1, 2023.

Appointed governors 

The first three governors of the Brazilian state of Mato Grosso do Sul were appointed by the president, in that time a representative of the military. For short periods, the president of the State Assembly acted as governor.

Elected governors 
Since 1982, Mato Grosso do Sul has held direct elections for governor.

References 

Mato Grosso do Sul
Governors of Mato Grosso do Sul